Events from the year 2022 in Taiwan, Republic of China. This year is numbered Minguo 111 according to the official Republic of China calendar.

Incumbents
 President: Tsai Ing-wen
 Vice President: Lai Ching-te
 Premier:
 Su Tseng-chang
 Vice Premier: 
 Shen Jong-chin

Events

Dates TBD
2022 U-23 Baseball World Cup

January-March
9 January 
 for Taipei City Constituency V, represented in the Legislative Yuan by Freddy Lim.
2022 Taiwanese legislative by-election held in Taichung City Constituency II, a vacant Legislative Yuan seat following the October 2021  legislator Chen Po-wei.
4–20 February Chinese Taipei at the 2022 Winter Olympics.

April-June
2 April – 2022 Chinese Professional Baseball League season begins.
24 June – Index case of the 2022 monkeypox outbreak in Taiwan reported.

July-September
2–3 August – 2022 visit by Nancy Pelosi to Taiwan
2 August – 2022 Chinese military exercises around Taiwan
17–18 September – 2022 Taitung earthquakes

October-December
26 November 
2022 Taiwanese local elections
2022 Taiwanese constitutional referendum

Deaths
11 January – Pang Chien-kuo, 68, politician, MLY (2002–2005), fall.
31 January – Liao Cheng-hao, 75, politician, Minister of Justice (1996–1998).
6 February – , 65, puppeteer (Pili).
7 February – Chen Shih-yung, 73, politician, Chiayi County magistrate (1989–1993).
8 February – , 51, television director (The Teen Age, Monga Yao Hui, Say I Love You) and actor.
11 February – Chen Wen-min, 102, filmmaker.
13 February – Gottfried Vonwyl, 90, Swiss-Taiwanese priest.
14 February – Lin Kun-hai, 68, media executive (Sanlih E-Television), oral cancer.
16 February 
, 94, entomologist.
Ba Ge, 67, actor, pancreatic cancer.
13 March – Tang Chuan, 69, actor (All in 700, Let's Go Crazy on LIVE!, Gold Leaf).
15 March – Lu Liang-Huan, 85, golfer.
19 March – Ku Pao-ming, 71, actor.
24 March – , 72, musician.
2 April – , 89, film director and regulator.
5 April – Jimmy Wang Yu, 79, actor and film director.
6 April – Wen Hsia, 93, singer and actor.
8 April – Peng Ming-min, 98, democracy activist.
6 May – George Huang, 88, politician, Changhua County magistrate (1981–1989), Chairman of the Central Election Commission (1994–1995, 1999–2004).
7 May – , 72, ethnologist and filmmaker.
9 May – , 88, actor and comedian.
12 June – , 65, puppeteer (Pili).
15 June – Chang Wen-i, 73, politician, MLY (1993–2002).
27 June – Wu Jin-yun, 84, Olympic athlete (1960). 
3 July – Miu Chu, 40, singer, breast cancer.
6 August – , 57, military researcher (National Chung-Shan Institute of Science and Technology), heart attack.

References

 
Taiwan
Taiwan
2020s in Taiwan
Years of the 21st century in Taiwan